Paul Hume may refer to:
 Paul Hume (music critic)
 Paul Hume (game designer)